The 1808 United States Senate election in Pennsylvania was held on December 13, 1808. Michael Leib was elected by the Pennsylvania General Assembly to the United States Senate.

Results
Incumbent Democratic-Republican Senator Samuel Maclay, who was elected in 1802, was not a candidate for re-election to a second term. The Pennsylvania General Assembly, consisting of the House of Representatives and the Senate, convened on December 13, 1808, to elect a new Senator to fill the term beginning on March 4, 1809. The results of the vote of both houses combined are as follows:

|-
|-bgcolor="#EEEEEE"
| colspan="3" align="right" | Totals
| align="right" | 126
| align="right" | 100.00%
|}

Although Leib's regular term did not begin until March 4, 1809, Leib assumed office in January 1809 following the resignation of his predecessor, Samuel Maclay. He subsequently served out the remainder of Sen. Maclay's term until his own term began in March 1809.

See also 

 United States Senate elections, 1808 and 1809

References

External links
Pennsylvania Election Statistics: 1682-2006 from the Wilkes University Election Statistics Project

1808
Pennsylvania
United States Senate